Logending Beach is one of the attractions of the beach which is located in the district of Central Java province Kebumen Indonesia. Logending Beach is often referred to as the Ayah beach because it is located in the coastal village of Ayah, Ayah districts Kebumen district. Although it is located in the district's Ayah, often referred Logending beaches are near or within the vicinity of a Gombong Kebumen districts in the county.

References

Beaches of Indonesia